Linden is a city in and the county seat of Marengo County, Alabama, United States. The population was 1,930 at the 2020 census, down from 2,123 at the 2010 census.

History
Settled prior to 1818, the community was first known as "Screamersville", since the cry of wild animals could still be heard during the night. It became the county seat in 1819 and was then known as the "Town of Marengo". This was changed to "Hohenlinden" in 1823, to honor the county's earliest European settlers, French Bonapartist refugees to the Vine and Olive Colony. The name commemorated the battle in 1800 at Hohenlinden, Bavaria, where the French defeated the armies of both Austria and Bavaria. The spelling was later shorten to just Linden.

Geography
Linden is located in central Marengo County at  (32.301154, −87.792650).

The city drains north to Chickasaw Bogue, a west-flowing tributary of the Tombigbee River, and south to Sycamore Creek, a tributary of Chickasaw Bogue.

Demographics

At the 2000 census, there were 2,424 people, 938 households, and 662 families living in the city. The racial makeup of the city was 52.43% White, 46.20% Black or African American, 0.17% Native American, 0.33% Asian, and 0.87% from two or more races.  1.07% of the population were Hispanic or Latino of any race.

Of the 938 households 33.0% had children under the age of 18 living with them, 45.1% were married couples living together, 22.1% had a female householder with no husband present, and 29.4% were non-families. 27.8% of households were one person and 14.4% were one person aged 65 or older.  The average household size was 2.48 and the average family size was 2.98.

The age distribution was 27.7% under the age of 18, 8.0% from 18 to 24, 23.8% from 25 to 44, 20.9% from 45 to 64, and 19.5% 65 or older.  The median age was 38 years. For every 100 females, there were 81.4 males.  For every 100 females age 18 and over, there were 74.3 males.

The median household income was $22,303 and the median family income was $30,733. Males had a median income of $38,964 versus $17,857 for females. The per capita income for the city was $16,536.  About 23.8% of families and 29.6% of the population were below the poverty line, including 46.8% of those under age 18 and 19.0% of those age 65 or over.

2010 census
At the 2010 census, there were 2,123 people, 877 households, and 555 families living in the city. The racial makeup of the city was 51.1% White, 46.7% Black or African American, 0.1% Native American, 0.2% Asian, and 0.9% from two or more races. 2.0% of the population were Hispanic or Latino of any race.

Of the 877 households 23.4% had children under the age of 18 living with them, 37.7% were married couples living together, 21.1% had a female householder with no husband present, and 36.7% were non-families. 34.3% of households were one person and 14.7% were one person aged 65 or older. The average household size was 2.25 and the average family size was 2.88.

The age distribution was 20.8% under the age of 18, 10.1% from 18 to 24, 21.2% from 25 to 44, 25.1% from 45 to 64, and 22.8% 65 or older. The median age was 42.6 years. For every 100 females, there were 85.1 males. For every 100 females age 18 and over, there were 92.0 males.

The median household income was $20,145 and the median family income was $35,714. Males had a median income of $30,833 versus $25,000 for females. The per capita income for the city was $14,701. About 31.1% of families and 31.8% of the population were below the poverty line, including 41.1% of those under age 18 and 8.7% of those age 65 or over.

2020 census

As of the 2020 United States Census, there were 1,930 people, 672 households, and 349 families residing in the city.

Transportation
 U.S. Highway 43
 State Route 28
 State Route 69

Linden is accessed by way of one U.S. Highway: US 43 which runs north-south through the city as Main Street connecting the city to Demopolis to the north and Thomasville to the south. SR 28 runs east-west through the city as Coats Avenue connecting the city to US 80 to the northwest and the towns of Thomaston and Camden to the southeast. SR 69 runs north-south through the city cosigned with US 43 before leaving US 43 at the far south end of town heading southwest towards Myrtlewood and connecting to Butler by way of SR 10.

In her 2021 State of the State address, Governor Kay Ivey confirmed that her administration would be moving forward with a long proposed plan to expand US 43 to four lanes from "Thomasville to Tuscaloosa." Upon completion, the expansion to US 43 will most likely pass around Linden by way of a bypass.

Media
The Linden Leader, a weekly newspaper, is based in Linden.

Education
The city runs its own citywide school system, Linden City Schools.  It also had one private school, Marengo Academy, founded in 1969; one of many segregation academies as they are known, which cropped up in the South after segregation was made illegal. Marengo Academy closed in 2019.

Notable people
Ralph Abernathy, civil rights leader
William J. Alston, United States Representative to the Thirty-first Congress
Frank Evans, professional baseball player in the Negro leagues
Autherine Lucy Foster, civil rights trailblazer; first African-American student at the University of Alabama 
Sean Richardson, safety for the Green Bay Packers
Roy Rogers, professional basketball player and coach

References

External links

Cities in Alabama
Cities in Marengo County, Alabama
County seats in Alabama
Populated places established in 1823
1823 establishments in Alabama